Minutophasma is a genus of insects in the family Mantophasmatidae. It is a monotypic genus consisting of the species Minutophasma redelinghuysense.

Its type locality is located slightly to the north of Eksteenfontein, Richtersveld, South Africa.

References

Mantophasmatidae
Monotypic insect genera
Insects of South Africa